

Composition of the troupe of the Comédie-Française in 1752 
The theatrical year began 10 April 1752 (the day before Palm) and ended 14 April 1753.

Director :

Sources 
 Almanach historique et chronologique de tous les spectacles, Paris 1753.

1752
1752 in France